Aberdeen Township is a township in Monmouth County, New Jersey, United States. The township is located within the Raritan Valley region and is a part of the New York Metropolitan Area. As of the 2020 United States Census, the township's population was 19,329, reflecting an increase of 1,119 (6.1%) from the 18,210 counted in the 2010 Census, which had an increase of 756 (+4.3%) from the 17,454 counted in the 2000 Census, which had in turn increased by 416 (+2.4%) from the 17,038 counted in the 1990 Census.

Aberdeen Township is part of the Bayshore Regional Strategic Plan, an effort by nine municipalities in northern Monmouth County to reinvigorate the area's economy by emphasizing the traditional downtowns, residential neighborhoods, maritime history, and natural environment of the Raritan Bay coastline.

History

Origins 
Those who settled in this area developed into the Lenni Lenape Native Americans. About the year 1000, an agricultural society developed, and small villages dotted what was to become New Jersey. The Lenape began a westward retreat in the face of European settlement and disease beginning in the late seventeenth century, beginning in Monmouth County by the mid-eighteenth century. Although the Lenape presently live in Ontario and Oklahoma, their legacy survives in such names as Mohingson, Luppatatong and Matawan Creeks and Raritan Bay.

The earliest known attempt at European settlement was in 1650 when the south side of Raritan Bay was purchased from the Lenni Lenape by the New Netherland Colony.

New Jersey
The earliest English land grant in New Aberdeen was in 1677 when Sir George Carteret granted  to Jonathan Holmes. This is in present-day Oakshades on Mohingson Creek.

Matawan Township changed its name in 1977 to Aberdeen Township, which harkened back to the name of the portion of Monmouth County referred to by Scottish settlers as "New Aberdeen."  New Aberdeen included the Northern portions of Monmouth County in the 1680s settled by Quakers and Presbyterians who fled Scotland to avoid religious persecution.

Owing to Rudyard's high office, this was quite controversial, and in 1685, the Board of Proprietors issued an order regarding the laying out of land. Section 7 addressed questionable activity such as Rudyard's, and he sold his land to his son-in-law, Samuel Winder.

The 1680s saw an influx of Scottish immigrants fleeing religious persecution in response to a 1683 book by George Scott extolling the virtues of Scottish settlement in East Jersey. These men and six others also purchased a landing site on Matawan Creek. The village site eventually came to be called Mount Pleasant, and the landing, as it became an important shipping point for the produce of Middletown Township, became Middletown Point. A third, very scattered settlement developed in the eighteenth century west of Matawan Creek, and was called Matawan or Matavan.

Middletown Township
In 1693, what was to become Aberdeen Township became part of Middletown Township which, at the time, consisted of what is now Aberdeen, Holmdel Township, Hazlet Township, Middletown (including Sandy Hook), Matawan Borough, Keyport, Union Beach, Keansburg, Atlantic Highlands, Highlands and a sliver of Colts Neck Township. A portion of the township that extended as far northwest as Cheesequake Creek, was ceded to Middlesex County in 1710.

Raritan Township
Middletown was considered too large and unwieldy, and legislation was passed in February 1848 that took the western half of Middletown Township to create a new municipality, Raritan Township (now Hazlet Township).

Matawan Township
Legislation sponsored by Assemblyman Beers passed the State General Assembly and Senate, was signed by Governor of New Jersey William A. Newell, and on February 23, 1857, Matavan Township was incorporated from portions of what was then Raritan Township. This included the village of Middletown Point, Mt. Pleasant, and Matavan. The Township was named for the creek as well as the village of Matavan. The spelling of "Matawan" or "Matavan" had been interchangeable, however, when the act was published "Matavan" had been used, which may derive from a Lenape word meaning "where two rivers come together". It may also originate from the Southern Unami Matawonge, "bad riverbank" or "bad hill", a possible reference to bluffs along Raritan Bay which were subject to erosion and collapse prior to the construction of a seawall in the 1970s. Another possible source is Matawan, Northern Unami for "bad fog", which may have referred to fog generated on Raritan Bay.

In 1865, due to postal confusion with Middletown, the Middletown Point post office was renamed "Matawan", to reflect the name of the Township. This section is the present downtown area of Matawan Borough. In 1882, the spelling of the Township was officially changed to "Matawan".

A small railroad station was erected along the New York and Long Branch Railroad tracks at a point called Hutchler's Crossing in 1875. Soon known as the Cliffwood Station, it operated on Cliffwood Avenue until the station closed in 1932.

In 1885, the Cliffwood post office was established and the name of the old Matavan settlement passed into obsolescence. Matawan was formed as a borough on June 28, 1895, from portions of Matawan Township, based on the results of a referendum held that day. Matawan expanded with portions of Matawan Township in 1931 and 1933.

In response to demand, a post office was established at Mount Pleasant in 1889. As that name was in use elsewhere, a new name was needed. "Freneau" was chosen, in honor of Philip Morin Freneau, the "Poet of Revolution," and a former Mount Pleasant resident who is buried in the area. This post office has since been closed.

Cliffwood Beach, formed in the 1920s, was originally a resort community until after World War II when year-round homes were the norm. River Gardens developed in the late 1940s. Strathmore was developed in the 1960s, adding suburban development to the community and doubling the Township's population.

Aberdeen Township
On November 8, 1977, the residents of Matawan Township voted to change the name of the Township to create a community identity separate from that of Matawan Borough. The residents voted to call their community Aberdeen Township. Officials believed the new name would draw attention to the Township, as it is listed first alphabetically among New Jersey's municipalities.

Today, Aberdeen is a suburban township of  containing a mix of residential, light industry and shopping centers. Sections of the township include Cliffwood, Cliffwood Beach, Freneau, Oakshades, River Gardens, Strathmore, Santa Fe Junction and Woodfield. The population is approximately 17,000. Three postal ZIP Codes serve the township: 07721, 07735, and 07747.

The Township is served by two volunteer fire companies, the Aberdeen Township Hose and Chemical Co. No. 1, organized in 1918, and the Cliffwood Volunteer Fire Co., organized in 1927. The Aberdeen Township Hose and Chemical Co. No. 1 marked its 100th anniversary on June 10, 2018, with a celebration at Lloyd Road Park and a parade along Lloyd Road. Two volunteer First Aid Squads response to the community's emergency medical needs; the Aberdeen Township First Aid and Rescue Squad, organized in 1954, and the South Aberdeen Emergency Medical Service, organized in 1970. A full-time Police Department was established in 1935.

The Henry Hudson Trail is a  paved trail built on a former Central Railroad of New Jersey right-of-way and extending from Aberdeen Township east to Atlantic Highlands.

Geography
According to the United States Census Bureau, the township had a total area of 7.77 square miles (20.13 km2), including 5.45 square miles (14.10 km2) of land and 2.33 square miles (6.03 km2) of water (29.95%).

The township is broken into two non-contiguous sections, with a small wedge-shaped exclave on the township's southwest corner separated from the rest of the township by a portion of Matawan on the opposite side of Route 79.

Cliffwood Beach (2010 Census population of 3,194) and Strathmore (2010 population of 7,258) are unincorporated communities and census-designated places (CDPs) located within Aberdeen Township. Other unincorporated communities within Aberdeen Township include Cliffwood and Henningers Mills.

The township borders Hazlet Township, Holmdel Township, Keansburg, Keyport, Marlboro Township and Matawan in Monmouth County; and Old Bridge Township in Middlesex County. The borough has a maritime border with Staten Island in New York City.

Demographics

Census 2010

The Census Bureau's 2006–2010 American Community Survey showed that (in 2010 inflation-adjusted dollars) median household income was $89,365 (with a margin of error of +/− $4,048) and the median family income was $101,174 (+/− $5,850). Males had a median income of $65,488 (+/− $5,575) versus $52,615 (+/− $3,635) for females. The per capita income for the borough was $39,830 (+/− $3,017). About 2.6% of families and 5.0% of the population were below the poverty line, including 4.6% of those under age 18 and 9.0% of those age 65 or over.

Census 2000
As of the 2000 United States Census there were 17,454 people, 6,421 households, and 4,770 families residing in the township.  The population density was 3,152.2 people per square mile (1,216.4/km2).  There were 6,558 housing units at an average density of 1,184.4 per square mile (457.1/km2).  The racial makeup of the township was 78.82% White, 12.02% African American, 0.14% Native American, 5.51% Asian, 0.01% Pacific Islander, 1.75% from other races, and 1.75% from two or more races. Hispanic or Latino of any race were 7.02% of the population.

There were 6,421 households, out of which 34.4% had children under the age of 18 living with them, 60.2% were married couples living together, 10.5% had a female householder with no husband present, and 25.7% were non-families. 20.2% of all households were made up of individuals, and 5.0% had someone living alone who was 65 years of age or older.  The average household size was 2.70 and the average family size was 3.14.

In the township the population was spread out, with 24.5% under the age of 18, 6.2% from 18 to 24, 35.0% from 25 to 44, 24.0% from 45 to 64, and 10.4% who were 65 years of age or older.  The median age was 37 years. For every 100 females, there were 95.1 males.  For every 100 females age 18 and over, there were 92.4 males.

The median income for a household in the township was $68,125, and the median income for a family was $76,648. Males had a median income of $51,649 versus $35,707 for females. The per capita income for the township was $28,984.  About 3.8% of families and 4.7% of the population were below the poverty line, including 7.1% of those under age 18 and 4.6% of those age 65 or over.

Government

Local government 

The township operates within the Faulkner Act under the Council-Manager form of government (Plan 3), implemented in its current form based on a direct petition as of January 1, 1990; the citizens of Aberdeen Township voted in November 1964 to change from the traditional Township Committee form of government, which had been in force since 1857. The township is one of 42 municipalities (of the 564) statewide that use this form of government. The governing body is comprised of the Mayor and the Township Council. In this Council-Manager form, all policy making power is concentrated in the council. The Mayor is a member of the council and presides over its meetings. The Manager, appointed by and reporting to the council, is the chief executive and oversees the day-to-day operation of the borough. A seven-member Township Council is elected at large for staggered, four-year terms of office in partisan elections held every in odd-numbered years as part of the November general election; four seats are up together, followed two years later by the mayoral seat and the two other council seats. The mayor is directly elected, while the council selects a deputy mayor from among its members.

, the Mayor of Aberdeen Township is Democrat Fred Tagliarini, whose term of office ends December 31, 2025. members of the Aberdeen Township Council are Deputy Mayor Concetta B. Kelley (D, 2023), Greg J. Cannon (D, 2023), Arthur S. Hirsch (D, 2023), Joseph J. Martucci Sr. (D, 2025), Margaret Montone (D, 2025) and Robert L. Swindle (D, 2023).

Federal, state and county representation 
Aberdeen Township is located in the 6th Congressional district and is part of New Jersey's 13th state legislative district.

 

Monmouth County is governed by a Board of County Commissioners comprised of five members who are elected at-large to serve three year terms of office on a staggered basis, with either one or two seats up for election each year as part of the November general election. At an annual reorganization meeting held in the beginning of January, the board selects one of its members to serve as Director and another as Deputy Director. , Monmouth County's Commissioners are
Commissioner Director Thomas A. Arnone (R, Neptune City, term as commissioner and as director ends December 31, 2022), 
Commissioner Deputy Director Susan M. Kiley (R, Hazlet Township, term as commissioner ends December 31, 2024; term as deputy commissioner director ends 2022),
Lillian G. Burry (R, Colts Neck Township, 2023),
Nick DiRocco (R, Wall Township, 2022), and 
Ross F. Licitra (R, Marlboro Township, 2023). 
Constitutional officers elected on a countywide basis are
County clerk Christine Giordano Hanlon (R, 2025; Ocean Township), 
Sheriff Shaun Golden (R, 2022; Howell Township) and 
Surrogate Rosemarie D. Peters (R, 2026; Middletown Township).

Politics

As of March 23, 2011, there were a total of 11,162 registered voters in Aberdeen Township, of which 3,145 (28.2%) were registered as Democrats, 1,988 (17.8%) were registered as Republicans and 6,021 (53.9%) were registered as Unaffiliated. There were 8 voters registered as Libertarians or Greens.

In the 2020 presidential election, Democrat Joe Biden received 53.7% of the vote (5,989 votes), ahead of Republican Donald Trump with 45% (5,021 votes), and other candidates receiving 1.3% (150 votes), among 11,160 votes cast by the township's 14,130 voters for a turnout 80%. In the 2016 presidential election, Democrat Hillary Clinton received 49.5% of the vote (4,328 votes), ahead of Republican Donald Trump with 47.2% (4,126 votes), and other candidates receiving 3.3% (284 votes), among 8,738 votes cast. In the 2012 presidential election, Democrat Barack Obama received 56.7% of the vote (4,109 cast), ahead of Republican Mitt Romney with 42.1% (3,054 votes), and other candidates with 1.2% (85 votes), among the 7,298 ballots cast by the township's 11,602 registered voters (50 ballots were spoiled), for a turnout of 62.9%. In the 2008 presidential election, Democrat Barack Obama received 53.5% of the vote (4,635 cast), ahead of Republican John McCain with 44.0% (3,817 votes) and other candidates with 1.0% (88 votes), among the 8,667 ballots cast by the township's 11,751 registered voters, for a turnout of 73.8%. In the 2004 presidential election, Democrat John Kerry received 51.7% of the vote (4,105 ballots cast), outpolling Republican George W. Bush with 45.9% (3,644 votes) and other candidates with 0.6% (67 votes), among the 7,944 ballots cast by the township's 11,084 registered voters, for a turnout percentage of 71.7.

In the 2020 Senate election, Democrat Cory Booker received 53.3% (5,880 votes), ahead of Republican Rik Mehta with 44.8% (4,938 votes), and other candidates received 2% (217 votes), among 11,035 votes cast.

In the 2020 House of Representatives election, Democrat Frank Pallone received 56% (6,437 votes), ahead of Republican Christian Onuoha with 44% of the vote, among 11,018 votes cast.

In the 2017 gubernatorial election, Democrat Phil Murphy received 50.5% (2,583 votes), ahead of Republican Kim Guadagno with 47.2% (2,418 votes), and other candidates receiving 2.3% (119 votes).  In the 2013 gubernatorial election, Republican Chris Christie received 64.8% of the vote (3,085 cast), ahead of Democrat Barbara Buono with 33.7% (1,603 votes), and other candidates with 1.6% (74 votes), among the 4,814 ballots cast by the township's 11,686 registered voters (52 ballots were spoiled), for a turnout of 41.2%. In the 2009 gubernatorial election, Republican Chris Christie received 55.7% of the vote (3,140 ballots cast), ahead of  Democrat Jon Corzine with 36.3% (2,048 votes), Independent Chris Daggett with 5.7% (322 votes) and other candidates with 1.1% (63 votes), among the 5,642 ballots cast by the township's 11,371 registered voters, yielding a 49.6% turnout.

Education 

Aberdeen Township is part of the Matawan-Aberdeen Regional School District, together with the neighboring community of Matawan. The district is a comprehensive system comprising seven schools, which includes one preschool, three elementary schools grades K–3, one 4–5 school, one middle school grades 6–8, one high school grades 9–12. As of the 2018–2019 school year, the district, comprised of seven schools, had an enrollment of 3,827 students and 324.1 classroom teachers (on an FTE basis), for a student–teacher ratio of 11.8:1. Schools in the district (with 2018–2019 enrollment data from the National Center for Education Statistics) are 
Cambridge Park Developmental Learning Center (12 students; Preschool), 
Cliffwood Elementary School (320; K–3), 
Ravine Drive Elementary School (326; K–3), 
Strathmore Elementary School (397; K–3), 
Lloyd Road Elementary School (614; 4–5), 
Matawan Aberdeen Middle School (888; 6–8) and 
Matawan Regional High School (1,112; 9–12). The MARSD Central Offices are located at 1 Crest Way, in Aberdeen. Seats on the district's nine-member board of education are allocated based on the population of the constituent municipalities, with six assigned to Aberdeen Township.

The township is home to the Yeshiva Gedolah of Cliffwood.

Transportation

Roads and highways

The Garden State Parkway is the largest highway in Aberdeen, with exit 118 in the township. Route 34 passes through in the southern area of the township, while Route 35 runs through the northern area.

Public transportation
NJ Transit provides bus transportation between the township and the Port Authority Bus Terminal in Midtown Manhattan on the 133 route and service on the 817 route.

The Aberdeen-Matawan station, located in Aberdeen, is a rail station on the NJ Transit North Jersey Coast Line,  with service north to New York Penn Station and south to Bay Head.

Notable people

People who were born in, residents of, or otherwise closely associated with Aberdeen Township include:

 Jay Bellamy (born 1972), safety who played in the NFL for the Seattle Seahawks and New Orleans Saints
 Andrew Bowne ( – ), colonial politician and jurist
 Anthony Brown American football quarterback for the Oregon Ducks
 Philip N. Gumbs (1923–2005), who served on the Monmouth County Board of Chosen Freeholders
 Erison Hurtault (born 1984), sprinter who has represented Dominica in international events
 Jodi Lyn O'Keefe (born 1978), actress and model, who at age 17 portrayed Cassidy Bridges on Nash Bridges
 Thomas J. Powers, politician who served on the Monmouth County Board of Chosen Freeholders and as Mayor of Aberdeen Township
 Charlie Rogers (born 1976), former NFL running back and wide receiver who played for the Seattle Seahawks, Buffalo Bills and Miami Dolphins
 David L. Smith, creator of the Melissa computer virus first identified in March 1999. Smith was sentenced in 2002 to serve 20 months in a federal prison
 Eileen Tell (born 1966), former professional tennis player

References

External links

Aberdeen Township website

 
1857 establishments in New Jersey
Faulkner Act (council–manager)
Populated places established in 1857
Raritan Bayshore
Townships in Monmouth County, New Jersey
Discontiguous municipalities in New Jersey